Rakesh Shukla is an Indian politician of the Bharatiya Janata Party (BJP) and former members of the Madhya Pradesh Legislative Assembly in the Mehgaon constituency.

References 
 RAKESH SHUKLA(Bharatiya Janata Party(BJP)):Constituency- Mehgaon(Bhind) - Affidavit Information of Candidate:
 पूर्व विधायक राकेश शुक्ला और बघेल भाजपा में शरीक
 MP polls: BJP MLA Rakesh Shukla confident of getting party ticket again
 PressReader.com - Your favorite newspapers and magazines.

Year of birth missing (living people)
Living people
Bharatiya Janata Party politicians from Madhya Pradesh
Madhya Pradesh MLAs 2008–2013